Joseph A. Diclerico Jr. (January 30, 1941 – April 2, 2022) was a United States district judge of the United States District Court for the District of New Hampshire.

Education and career

Born in Lynn, Massachusetts, Diclerico received a Bachelor of Arts from Williams College in 1963 and a Bachelor of Laws from Yale Law School in 1966. He was a law clerk to Judge Aloysius J. Connor of the United States District Court for the District of New Hampshire from 1966 to 1967, and was then a law clerk to the New Hampshire Supreme Court from 1967 to 1968. He was in private practice in Concord, New Hampshire from 1968 to 1970. He was an assistant state attorney general of New Hampshire from 1970 to 1977. He was an associate justice of the New Hampshire Superior Court from 1977 to 1991, and chief justice of that court from 1991 to 1992.

Federal judicial service

On April 9, 1992, Diclerico was nominated by President George H. W. Bush to a new seat on the United States District Court for the District of New Hampshire created by 104 Stat. 5089. He was confirmed by the United States Senate on August 12, 1992, and received his commission on August 17, 1992. He served as Chief Judge from 1992 to 1997. He assumed senior status on March 15, 2007. Diclerico died on April 2, 2022, at the age of 81.

References

Sources
 

1941 births
2022 deaths
20th-century American judges
21st-century American judges
American people of Italian descent
Judges of the United States District Court for the District of New Hampshire
New Hampshire state court judges
People from Lynn, Massachusetts
Superior court judges in the United States
United States district court judges appointed by George H. W. Bush
Williams College alumni
Yale Law School alumni